Andre Schmid (born 30 August 1983) is a Swiss handballer for HC Kriens-Luzern and the Swiss national team.

Achievements
EHF Cup:
Winner: 2013
Swiss Handball League:
Winner: 2008, 2009
Handball-Bundesliga:
Winner: 2016, 2017
DHB-Pokal:
Winner: 2018
DHB-Supercup:
Winner: 2016, 2017, 2018

Individual awards
 Handball-Bundesliga Player of the Season: 2014, 2015, 2016, 2017, 2018
 Swiss Handball League MVP: 2008, 2009
 All-Star Playmaker of the Danish Handball League: 2010

See also
List of handballers with 1000 or more international goals

References

External links

1983 births
Living people
People from Horgen
Swiss male handball players
Expatriate handball players
Swiss expatriate sportspeople in Denmark
Swiss expatriate sportspeople in Germany
Rhein-Neckar Löwen players
Handball-Bundesliga players
Sportspeople from the canton of Zürich